David Howe Gillmore, Baron Gillmore of Thamesfield, GCMG,(16 August 1934 – 20 March 1999) was a British diplomat. He retired in 1994 after a distinguished diplomatic career in which he was a leading light in John Major's extrication of the UK from its policy of confronting apartheid South Africa. He was educated at Trent College.

Career
After service in HM Forces from 1953 to 1955, he spent a short time living in Paris, before returning to the UK to work as a French and English teacher at Wilson's Grammar School in Camberwell, London, from 1967 - 1970, where he will be remembered. He joined the Foreign and Commonwealth Office in 1970. Two years later, he was posted as First Secretary (Commercial) to Moscow. He was appointed Counsellor and Head of Chancery UKDEL, MBFR Vienna in 1975. He was appointed Head of Defence Department FCO in 1979, becoming Assistant Under-Secretary of State in 1981. David Gillmore was appointed High Commissioner in Malaysia in 1983. Gillmore was appointed Permanent Under-Secretary at the Foreign Office in 1991,

Family
David Gillmore married Lucile Sophie Morin in 1964. They had two sons (1967 and 1970).

Honours
On 21 February 1996, he was created a life peer as Baron Gillmore of Thamesfield, of Putney in the London Borough of Wandsworth.

References

External links
Interview with David Howe, Baron Gillmore & transcript, British Diplomatic Oral History Programme, Churchill College, Cambridge, 1996

Offices held

 

1934 births
1999 deaths
Members of HM Diplomatic Service
High Commissioners of the United Kingdom to Malaysia
Gillmore of Thamesfield
Knights Grand Cross of the Order of St Michael and St George
Permanent Under-Secretaries of State for Foreign Affairs
20th-century British diplomats
Life peers created by Elizabeth II